On the Radio may refer to:
"On the Radio" (The Concretes song), 2006
"On the Radio" (Donna Summer song), 1979
On the Radio: Greatest Hits Volumes I & II, a 1979 album by Donna Summer
"On the Radio" (Groove Coverage song), 2006
"On the Radio" (Regina Spektor song), 2006
"... On the Radio (Remember the Days)", a 2001 single by Nelly Furtado
"On the Radio", a song from Cheap Trick's 1978 album, Heaven Tonight
"On the Radio", a song from HURT's third album, Vol. II
"On the Radio", a 2006 single by Poni Hoax
"On the Radio", a song from Thunder's 2008 album, Bang!
"On the Radio", a song from Crash Crew's 1984 album, The Crash Crew
"Shit on the Radio", a song by Robbie Williams from his album Take the Crown

See also
Radio (disambiguation)